Petit Lac Saint-François or Lake Tomcod is a lake in the municipality of Saint-François-Xavier-de-Brompton, in regional county municipality (MRC) of Le Val-Saint-François, in the administrative region of Estrie, Quebec, Canada. Cyanobacteria (blue-green algae) are present in the lake.

Geography 
This lake borders the east side of the village of Saint-François-Xavier-de-Brompton. It is located south of route 249 and west of highway 55.

Toponymy 
The toponym "Petit lac Saint-François" was made official on December 5, 1968, at the Commission de toponymie du Québec.

References 

Lakes of Estrie
Le Val-Saint-François Regional County Municipality